The men's cycling team pursuit at the 2016 Summer Olympics in Rio de Janeiro took place at the Rio Olympic Velodrome on 11 and 12 August. Team GB established new Olympic and World Records in both their heat and in the final; their gold medal made Sir Bradley Wiggins Britain's most decorated Olympian.

The medals were presented by James Tomkins, IOC member, Australia and Brian Cookson, President of the UCI.

Schedule 
All times are Brasília Time

Results

Qualifications
The fastest 8 teams qualify for the first round, from which the top 4 remain in contention for the gold medal final and the other 4 for the bronze medal final.

 Q = qualified; in contention for gold medal final
 q = qualified; in contention for bronze medal final

First round
First round heats are held as follows:
Heat 1: 6th v 7th qualifier
Heat 2: 5th v 8th qualifier
Heat 3: 2nd v 3rd qualifier
Heat 4: 1st v 4th qualifier

The winners of heats 3 and 4 proceed to the gold medal final.
The remaining 6 teams are ranked on time, then proceed to the finals for bronze, 5th or 7th place.

 QG = qualified for gold medal final
 QB = qualified for bronze medal final
 Q5 = qualified for 5th place final
 Q7 = qualified for 7th place final

Finals
The final classification is determined in the ranking finals.

References

team pursuit
Cycling at the Summer Olympics – Men's team pursuit
Men's events at the 2016 Summer Olympics